The 1935 NCAA baseball season, play of college baseball in the United States organized by the National Collegiate Athletic Association (NCAA) began in the spring of 1935.  Play largely consisted of regional matchups, some organized by conferences, and ended in June.  No national championship event was held until 1947.

Conference winners
This is a partial list of conference champions from the 1935 season.

Conference standings
The following is an incomplete list of conference standings:

References

1935 in American sports
1935 in baseball
College baseball seasons in the United States